Grotto of Miracles is the second studio album by American experimental rock band Sun City Girls. It was released in 1986 by Placebo Records. Like many Sun City Girls LPs, Grotto of Miracles has become a collector's item.

Critical reception
Trouser Press wrote: "With demented lyrical concepts and such offbeat accessories as antelope bells, chimes and temple blocks, Grotto of Miracles is an ethnic stew that shows enormous creative growth." The Chicago Reader wrote that the band's "wiggy instrumentals were flavored by surf rock, jazz, and noise, and would give way to pummeling art rock, nonsensical rants, and meandering improvisation." Perfect Sound Forever praised the "beautiful, Rick [Bishop]-heavy, unusually near-accessible first side." Maximum Rocknroll called the album "very musical, poetic, downright pretty, distinctively ugly, the great acid experience or background music."

Track listing

Personnel
Adapted from the Grotto of Miracles liner notes.

Sun City Girls
 Alan Bishop – bass guitar, melodica, autoharp, alto saxophone, trumpet, tape, percussion, vocals
 Richard Bishop – electric guitar, lap steel guitar, piano, keyboards, organ, melodica, cello, violin, flute, bells, percussion, vocals
 Charles Gocher – drums, percussion, temple block, bells, chimes, cymbal, gong, güiro, maracas, tambourine, autoharp, flute, horns, vocals

Production and additional personnel
 Tom Connell – engineering, mixing
 Joseph Cultice – photography
 David Oliphant – mixing
 Wade Olson – engineering
 Peggy Slinger – cover art
 Sun City Girls – mixing, design

Release history

References 

1986 albums
Sun City Girls albums